Vedrana Grbović is a Serbian beauty pageant contestant and model who won the title of Miss Serbia in 2006 and represented her country in Miss World 2006. She graduated from the Curtin University of Technology with a BCom in Marketing and Advertising in 2009 and went on to complete her MSc in International Marketing and Business Development at SKEMA Business School in France in 2012. Vedrana has been the director of marketing agency Fresca Viva Pty Ltd since 2007.

Early life
Grbovic was born in Belgrade, although she and her family would later move to Australia.  She went on to appear in fashion shows in Belgrade, Perth, Los Angeles, Greece, and Italy.  She won the titles of Miss Prom 2004 and Miss Earth Australia (W.A.) 2005 and has appeared in many television shows in Serbia, as well as music video clips and television advertisements.

She is a professionally trained dancer and actress, although she graduated with a degree in marketing and advertising.

Miss Serbia & Montenegro 
In 2006, then a Curtin University student, Vedrana was named Miss World Serbia & Montenegro.

Community work 
Vedrana is an active contributor and participant in the Serbian community events in Australia. She is actively engaged in and supports community events organised by the Serbian Orthodox Church. 
Vedrana also contributed to implementation of Hopman Cup in 2008.

References

External links 
 
 Vedrana on starnow.com.au

Models from Belgrade
Living people
Serbian female models
Miss Serbia winners
Serbian beauty pageant winners
1987 births
Miss World 2006 delegates